Autovía LE-30 is an autovía in the city of León, Castile and León, Spain. Designed as a beltway or orbital road, it is the outer ring and runs around the south edge of the city. The highway was constructed in two sections: from N-601 to N-630 (exit 4, Avenida de Antibióticos); and then the remainder to the Virgen del Camino interchange (exits 9A/B).

External links

Autopistas and autovías in Spain
Transport in Castile and León